Philippe Monnet (born 31 January 1959) is a single-handed sailor from France, born in La Clusaz. He is the brother in law of French singer Julien Clerc.

Biography
Originally from La Clusaz, he is a pioneer of maritime routes and a single-handed and crewed sailing record holder. He has accumulated more 250 000 nautical miles in single-handed or crewed races. He set a new record during his first solo round the world trip.

He sailed the 1981–82 Whitbread Round the World Race on board Vivanapoli.

Records
1988: World record - solo sail on "Kriter" (Olivier de Kersauson's trimaran) (129d 19h 17').
1989: Record New York City - San Francisco, multihull and solo (81d 5h).
1990: Record Hong-Kong - London (Tea Route), multihull and solo (67d 10h 26').
1998: 6th place in the Route du Rhum, aboard a monohull
2000: Record for non-stop reverse circumnavigation on "Uunet" (previously Philippe Poupon's "Fleury Michon"), monohull  (151d 19h 54').

Bibliography
 J'ai entraperçu les moustaches du Diable (2000)
 Le Monde à l'envers (2000)

Further reading
 (préf. Olivier de Kersauson).

Paris-Dakar 
Monnet won the Paris-Dakar twice: as co-driver alongside Hubert Auriol in 1992, and with Jean-Louis Schlesser in 1999.

References

External links
Official website

1959 births
Living people
French male sailors (sport)
Single-handed circumnavigating sailors
French racing drivers
Off-road racing drivers
French rally co-drivers
Volvo Ocean Race sailors
Dakar Rally co-drivers